The 2015 NCAA Division II women's basketball tournament was the 34th annual tournament hosted by the NCAA to determine the national champion of Division II women's  collegiate basketball in the United States.

California (PA) defeated California Baptist in the championship game, 86–69, to claim the Vulcans' second NCAA Division II national title and first since 2004.

The championship rounds were contested at the Sanford Pentagon in Sioux Falls, South Dakota.

Regionals

Atlantic - California, Pennsylvania
Location: Hamer Hall Host: California University of Pennsylvania

South - Jackson, Tennessee
Location: Fred DeLay Gymnasium Host: Union University

Central - Hays, Kansas
Location: Gross Memorial Coliseum Host: Fort Hays State University

South Central - Canyon, Texas
Location: First United Bank Center Host: West Texas A&M University

West - Anchorage, Alaska
Location: Alaska Airlines Center Host: University of Alaska at Anchorage

East - Garden City, New York
Location: New York Center for Recreation and Sport Host: Adelphi University

Southeast - Gaffney, South Carolina
Location: Timken Center Host: Limestone College

Midwest - Houghton, Michigan
Location: SDC Gym Host: Michigan Technological University

Elite Eight - Sioux Falls, South Dakota
Location: Sanford Pentagon Host: Northern Sun Intercollegiate Conference

All-tournament team
 Kaitlynn Fratz, California (PA)
 Miki Glenn, California (PA)
 Emma Mahady, California (PA)
 Darsha Burnside, California Baptist
 Courtney Nelson, California Baptist

See also
 2015 NCAA Division I women's basketball tournament
 2015 NCAA Division III women's basketball tournament
 2015 NAIA Division I women's basketball tournament
 2015 NAIA Division II women's basketball tournament
 2015 NCAA Division II men's basketball tournament

References
 2015 NCAA Division II women's basketball tournament jonfmorse.com

 
NCAA Division II women's basketball tournament
2015 in South Dakota